Sasan Hosseini is an Iranian football forward who currently plays for Paykan F.C. in the Persian Gulf Pro League.

Honours
Foolad
Iranian Super Cup: 2021

References

Living people
1997 births
Association football midfielders
Iranian footballers
Naft Masjed Soleyman F.C. players
Pars Jonoubi Jam players
Aluminium Arak players
Foolad FC players